William Renner (1846–1917), best known as W. Renner was an African surgeon and cancer researcher.

Biography

Renner was born in Sierra Leone to an affluent Creole family. He studied at Liverpool College, University College London and in Dublin and Brussels. He qualified M.D. at the Free University of Brussels in 1881. He trained in London for an M.R.C.S. and obtained an Orphthalmic assistantship.

He practiced medicine on the Gulf of Guinea and from 1882 to his death was a surgeon in Sierra Leone where he was consulting surgeon to all its hospitals. He worked as Assistant Colonial Surgeon.

In 1912 he changed his name to William Awoonor-Renner.

Cancer research

Renner stated that there was an increasing number of cases of cancer of different organs, especially the breast among the descendants of the liberated Africans or Creoles of Sierra Leone, whilst cancer was rare among the aborigines of West Africa. According to Renner, cancer was rarely found among the hundreds of female aborigines who were treated every year at the Colonial Hospital nor reported by medical
officers in large towns at dispensaries where natives have been encouraged to attend for treatment.

He concluded that cancer was rare among the aborigines because of "their primitive mode of living" such as eating grains and vegetables whilst the Creoles had adopted the habits of the European civilization such as eating large quantities of butchers meat. He reported his findings in a paper for The British Medical Journal, in 1910.

John Randle disagreed with Renner's theory and stated that cancer was seen less frequently among aborigines in hospital because natives were superstitious and would instead prefer to visit local country doctors. Randle also described cases of cancer he had encountered among the aborigines and concluded that "malignant diseases are not a rarity amongst the aborigines in any part of West Africa".

Selected publications

The Spread Of Cancer Among The Descendants Of The Liberated Africans Or Creoles Of Sierra Leone (The British Medical Journal, 1910)

References

1846 births
1917 deaths
19th-century Sierra Leonean physicians
20th-century Sierra Leonean physicians
Alumni of University College London
Cancer researchers
Sierra Leonean surgeons
Sierra Leone Creole people
People educated at Liverpool College